Lily Pond is an unincorporated community in Gordon County, in the U.S. state of Georgia.

History
A post office called Lilly Pond was established in 1872, and remained in operation until being discontinued in 1910. The community was named after the lilly pads in a pond near the original town site.

References

Unincorporated communities in Gordon County, Georgia
Unincorporated communities in Georgia (U.S. state)